The A23 autoroute is a highway in northern France.

Route
The road passes northwest/southeast from the Lille conurbation to the town of Valenciennes effectively linking the A1 and A2 autoroutes.

Junctions

References

External links

A23 autoroute in Saratlas

A23